Gun-Mari Lindholm (born 29 March 1962) is a politician on the autonomous Åland Islands. She is Vice-President of the EUDemocrats - Alliance for a Europe of Democracies.

 Member of the Lagting (Åland parliament) 2005-
 Minister of Social Affairs and Environment 2003-2005 
 Chairwoman of the Åland Independent Party since 2001
 Member of the Lagting (Åland parliament) 1999-2003

See also 
 Government of Åland

References

External links 
 The Parliament of Åland

1962 births
Living people
Women government ministers of Åland
20th-century Finnish women politicians
21st-century Finnish women politicians
Government ministers of Åland